Johann Carl Loth (Baptized 8 August 1632 – 6 October 1698) was a German Baroque painter who spent most of his life in Venice. His name is also rendered as Johann Karl, Karel and, in Italy, Carlotto or Carlo Lotti.

He specialized in history paintings; generally crowded group scenes. His subjects were typically from classical mythology or the Old Testament.

Biography
He was born in Munich, Bavaria. According to the biographer, Arnold Houbraken, he was one of the three grand masters of art named "Karel", or "Carl" (the other two were Karel Dujardin and Karel Marat, usually called Carlo Maratta).

He was once commissioned to paint for the emperor Leopold I in Vienna and  worked together with Pietro Liberi in Venice, where he lived from 1663 until his death in 1698. His brother Franz (1639–1710) was also a painter in Venice and Germany and often collaborated with Carl.

He had numerous pupils, including , Santo Prunati, Johann Michael Rottmayr, Hans Adam Weissenkircher, Daniel Seiter, and Baron Peter Strudel.

Popularity among Dutch artists

He attracted well-to-do artists, such as Cornelis de Bruijn and Jan van Bunnik, who made trips especially to visit his studio. Willem Drost and Jan Vermeer van Utrecht were among his close friends. He is buried in the church of San Luca, Venice.

His works are mostly in Germany and Italy. Other museums with works by Loth include the Art Institute of Chicago and the National Gallery, London. Burghley House in England has two large paintings in the chapel.

Gallery

References 

Dictionary of Painters and Engravers. Michael Bryan. pp. 78–79.

External links 

Johann Carl Loth on Artnet

1632 births
1698 deaths
17th-century German painters
German male painters
Artists from Munich
17th-century Italian painters
Italian male painters
German Baroque painters
Painters from Venice
Italian Baroque painters